Renewable energy in Albania includes biomass, geothermal, hydropower, solar, and wind energy. Albania relies mostly on hydroelectric resources, therefore, it has difficulties when water levels are low. The climate in Albania is Mediterranean, so it possesses considerable potential for solar energy production. Mountain elevations provide good areas for wind projects. There is also potentially usable geothermal energy because Albania has natural wells.

Hydro power
The current electricity source in Albania is mostly from hydropower plants, however, this is not very reliable since water levels fluctuate. Verbund, an Austrian company, and Albania made an agreement to construct the hydropower plant Ashta in 2012. It is estimated to supply power to approximately 100,000 households.

Solar power

The United Nations Development Program is supporting a program to install solar panels in Albania. By 2010,  of solar panels were installed and by 2014 the target had been met. Albania gets about 2100–2700 hours of sunshine in a year so it has a great potential for solar energy. Solar energy is easily accessible since most energy comes directly or indirectly from the sun. It could be used for heating and lighting homes, commercial, and industrial buildings.

Wind power
Albania has enormous potential for electric energy from wind power. Notwithstanding the total licenses distributed throughout the country amounting to approximately 2548 MW with an energy generation potential around 5.7 TWh/year, yet no wind farm projects have been completed, and very few are currently in the pipeline in some way. The coastal lowlands and Southern, Eastern, and Northern Albania mountains are excellent areas for wind turbines. The wind speed is 8–9 m/s in many areas of Albania.

Geothermal energy
Geothermal energy could also be used in Albania. It comes from warm water sources from underground soil. Geothermal energy comes from the heat generated by the Earth. There are some spots called hot spots that generate more heat than others. There are natural wells near Albania's border with Greece. This energy could be used for heating purposes. Geothermal energy in Albania is under study and there have been no attempts to use it yet.

Laws and petitions
The Power Sector Law No.9073, approved in 2004, gives permits to construct new hydropower plants.

The Concession Law No.9663, approved in 2006, attracts private investments in hydropower plants.

Albania placed a tariff for existing and new hydropower plants in 2007.

The Electricity Market Model was approved in 2008. It facilitates purchases between independent power producers and small power producers. It allows producers to sell electricity to all markets at agreed terms. Non-household customers can become eligible consumers and choose their energy suppliers. This helps renewable energy to be more accessible.

See also

 Renewable energy in the European Union
 Solar power in Albania
 Hydroelectricity in Albania
 Renewable energy by country

References

External links